Romain Matthys (born 10 July 1998) is a Belgian professional footballer who plays as a goalkeeper for the Eerste Divisie club MVV.

Career

RFC Liège
Matthys started playing football at Euro Youth Liège 75, which merged with Daring Club De Cointe in 2007. In 2012, he joined the youth academy of RFC Liège, where he had his first opportunity to sit on the bench with the first team in the 2015–16 season. On 7 August 2016, he made his official debut for the club's first team during the Belgian Cup game against RFC Warnant, which the Liège side won 3–1.

He played his first league game for RFC Liège against RRC Hamoir in the Belgian Second Amateur Division on 13 November 2016. From January 2017 on, he became the club's starting goalkeeper. Matthys made 18 league appearances for RFC Liège in his debut season, including play-off matches against Olympic Charleroi, Olsa Brakel and Eendracht Aalst. RFC Liège ended up narrowly missing out on promotion to First Amateur Division. A year later, the managed to win promotion to the First Amateur Division, where Matthys remained starting goalkeeper.

Eupen
On 17 July 2019, Matthys secured a transfer to top division Belgian Pro League club Eupen, where he signed a three-year contract, becoming the backup to Ortwin De Wolf alongside Abdul Manaf Nurudeen. In his debut season with Eupen, he made only one official appearance: a cup match against Cappellen, which Eupen won after a penalty shootout.

RWDM (loan)
In August 2020, Eupen sent Matthys on loan to RWDM for one season. He made his competitive debut for the club on 10 October 2020 in the cup match against Union Rochefortoise, which RWDM won 8–1. When starting goalkeeper Anthony Sadin was deemed unfit for the league match against Lommel on 24 January 2021, Matthys made his debut in Belgian First Division B. RWDM lost this match 3–2, despite having a 2–0 lead at half-time. A week later, he also started the derby against Union Saint-Gilloise, which RWDM lost 2–0. Afterwards, Sadin took over the starting job once again.

MVV
In July 2021, alongside Eupen teammates Simon Libert and Marciano Aziz, Matthys was sent on a one-season loan to Dutch Eerste Divisie club MVV, where Matthys became the backup to Thijmen Nijhuis, who had been loaned from Utrecht in the same transfer window. On 26 October 2021, Matthys made his competitive debut for MVV in the cup match against ACV Assen, which head coach Klaas Wels had him start. In this match, Matthys not only kept a clean sheet, but also delivered an assist to Mart Remans' 2–0 goal. On 5 November 2021, he made his league debut for MVV in the 1–0 win over Jong AZ, keeping another clean sheet in another 90-minute performance. Matthys stayed on as starting goalkeeper from then on, and was named in the Eerste Divisie Team of the Year for the 2021–22 season.

In April 2022, Matthys signed a two-year permanent deal with MVV, with an option for a third season.

Career statistics

Honours
Individual
 Eerste Divisie Team of the Year: 2021–22

References

External links
 

1998 births
Living people
Association football goalkeepers
Challenger Pro League players
Belgian National Division 1 players
Belgian footballers
Eerste Divisie players
Footballers from Liège Province
K.A.S. Eupen players
MVV Maastricht players
People from Seraing
RFC Liège players
RWDM47 players